The 1986 Football Cup of Ukrainian SSR among KFK  was the annual season of Ukraine's football knockout competition for amateur football teams.

Competition schedule

Qualification round

|}
Notes:

Quarterfinals (1/4)

|}

Semifinals (1/2)

|}

Final

|}

See also
 1986 KFK competitions (Ukraine)

External links
 (1986 - 49 чемпионат СССР Кубок Украинской ССР среди КФК) at footbook.ru

Ukrainian Amateur Cup
Ukrainian Amateur Cup
Amateur Cup